Potamogeton cristatus, the little-leaf pondweed, is an aquatic plant species in the genus Potamogeton. It is found in slow moving fresh water.

Distribution
It is native to the Russian Far East and Eastern Asia.

References

External links

Flora of Eastern Asia
Flora of Korea
Flora of the Russian Far East
Freshwater plants
Plants described in 1861
cristatus